Mick Betteridge (1924–1999) was a footballer who played as an inside forward in the Football League for West Bromwich Albion, Swindon Town and Chester.

References

1924 births
1999 deaths
People from Alcester
Association football inside forwards
English footballers
West Bromwich Albion F.C. players
Swindon Town F.C. players
Chester City F.C. players
Leek Town F.C. players
English Football League players